The Football Kingz were New Zealand's first professional football club. They played in the Australian National Soccer League from 1999 until their disestablishment in 2004, when they were replaced by the New Zealand Knights as an inaugural participant in the newly established Australian A-League.

History
Football Kingz FC (promoted as Auckland Kingz within Australia) joined the Australian National Soccer League in 1999 and proceeded to play in the last five seasons of the NSL, failing to qualify for the play-offs in every season. The club was originally to use the spelling of "Kings", however this was changed to the Kingz after receiving legal threats from Australian basketball team the Sydney Kings.

The first season – 1999–2000
Their inaugural coach was OFC Player of the Century and former New Zealand international Wynton Rufer in a player-coach role, with his brother Shane as assistant coach. They played their inaugural game on the evening of 1 October 1999 at North Harbour Stadium in front of then the largest crowd to watch a club game in New Zealand.  The game was played against Carlton SC and even though it resulted in a 0–3 loss was an enthralling start to the professional era in New Zealand.
This first season would end up being the club's most successful with 15 wins. The team finished eighth of sixteen teams.

Season Two – 2000–2001
After an encouraging first season the club set out to improve its performance on and off the park.  There were a number of foreign signings, mostly from Brazil, that seemed good on paper but flopped on the park.  One of these imports though immediately became a fan favourite, Dennis Ibrahim.  The German went on to become the club's top scorer during the season, managing two hat-tricks (in a 3–2 win over the Brisbane Strikers at home on 30 March 2001 and against Sydney United in a 4–2 away win on 29 April 2001).  The team's best result proved to be a 5–1 home win over the Newcastle Breakers on 27 October 2000. The team again finished in eighth place, winning 12 games.

Season Three – 2001–2002
Seasons One and Two showed the potential of the team (they would turn out to be the most successful seasons from a professional New Zealand football team until the Wellington Phoenix FC made the play-offs in 2009) and so Sky Television New Zealand became involved in the club. Their first move was to remove Wynton Rufer as coach while still wanting him to remain a player. Rufer's desire, however, was to remain as coach and to retire slowly as a player, and he immediately retired from playing. Mike Petersen was signed as the new manager and he brought with him a number of players including a young goalkeeper Michael Theoklitos to be part of the squad.  His tenure lasted just five games. He started the season with a loss away to the Brisbane Strikers and three games later presided over an embarrassing 2–7 home loss to Perth Glory.  The following game, a 2–2 draw away to Wollongong Wolves on 2 November 2001 was his last, walking out after it.  A number of Australian players soon following him. Shane Rufer stepped in to become the club's caretaker manager.  This tenure only lasted for two games but he achieved a win and draw from these games. Kevin Fallon was announced as the new manager, but the damage to the club had already been done and it ended up finishing with the "wooden spoon" in 13th place, this costing Fallon his job.

Season Four – 2002–2003
After the previous season's poor form, the club's owners drastically slashed the club's budget.  Ken Dugdale was signed as the new coach.  He had just finished a very successful stint as the manager of the All Whites, having won the Oceania Nations Cup and managed the team through their first involvement in the Confederations Cup where the All Whites performed very well.  As he had a reduced budget he recruited from around New Zealand introducing to the team Raf de Gregorio and Jeremy Christie.  While the club had some very talented young players it struggled to compete but managed to achieve a better final position in the National Soccer League than the season before, finishing 11 out of 13.

The final season – 2003–2004
The National Soccer League was in a very bad financial state and fans were losing interest across the competition.  This led the Australian Government to commission a report in to Soccer Australia and the NSL.  Its recommendation was to abolish both Soccer Australia and the NSL and replace them with a new governing body and a new competition (Soccer Australia was broke and the NSL was unable to break away from its Euro Ethnic roots in parts of Australia). Knowing that this was going to be the last NSL season very little was spent on improving the squad and rumours spread that the club was struggling financially.  Ken Dugdale remained manager, but the season started the way the previous one had finished.  The club struggled on the playing field.  In mid-season an announcement was made that the club was being bought out and its debts cleared.  This was to cost Ken Dugdale his job and he was replaced on a temporary basis by his assistant Tommy Mason.  Mason was soon confirmed as the club's permanent manager, even though many felt that he was not up to the role.  The new owners felt that the playing squad needed strengthening and brought Danny Hay in, making him the new captain at the same time.  Even with this new impetus the club again finished bottom of the league having only won four games.  The club's very last game was on Sunday 29 February 2004 winning 4–3 at home to the Brisbane Strikers.

All time records
Record victory: 5–1  vs Newcastle United (H), 26 October 2000
Record defeat: 0–7  vs Parramatta Power (A), 14 February 2003
Highest aggregate score: 9 goals: (2 games, both losses)
2–7 vs Perth Glory (H), 25 October 2001
4–5 vs South Melbourne (H), 15 March 2003
Record league attendance: 13,111 (vs Marconi Stallions 16 March 2001)
Lowest league attendance: 1,057 (vs Northern Spirit FC 27 February 2003)
 Home attendance figures for the final season are not included
Longest winning streak: 3 games (15 November 2002 – 6 December 2002)
Longest undefeated streak: 7 games (23 February 2001 – 6 April 2001)
Longest losing streak: 7 games (15 March 2003 – 7 November 2003)
Longest winless streak: 9 games (29 November 2003 – 10 January 2004)
Most goals in a game: 4 – Harry Ngata vs Northern Spirit (H), 27 September 2002
Most goals in a season: 12 – Dennis Ibrahim 2001–2002
All-time most appearances: 129 – Harry Ngata
All-time top scorer: 29 – Harry Ngata

National Soccer League

NSL seasonal results

All-time NSL win/loss

Managers

Player records

Most appearances

Most goals

Kingz Players

see List of Football Kingz F.C. players

See also
Wellington Phoenix FC
New Zealand Knights FC
New Zealand Football
Football Federation Australia
A-League

Notes

a Caretaker manager during October 2001.
b Caretaker manager for two games.
c Resigned after eight games in 2003.

References

http://www.soccerway.com/teams/australia/football-kingz/
http://www.ultimatenzsoccer.com/NZRepSoccer/id820.htm
http://www.ozfootball.net/ark/NSL/20002001/reports/report085.html  match report between the Kingz & Sydney United fc, 29/04/2001.
http://www.bigfooty.com/forum/showthread.php?t=150425 Results
http://www.ultimatenzsoccer.com/id744.htm Results
http://plainsrangers.com/kingz.html Results

External links

Knigz FC
Association football clubs established in 1999
Association football clubs disestablished in 2004
Association football clubs in Auckland
1999 establishments in New Zealand
2004 disestablishments in New Zealand